The Church of St Helen, Ranworth, Norfolk is a church of medieval origins notable for its collection of church paintings. Known as "the cathedral of The Broads", the church dates from the 14th century, although with origins in Saxon times. It contains a major collection of medieval artefacts, in particular the rood screen and the Ranworth Antiphoner, a liturgical manuscript.

The church remains an active parish church and is a Grade I listed building.

History
Known as "the cathedral of The Broads", Historic England's listing records describes St Helen's as of the 15th century, although other sources date it to the 14th. Pevsner records roof beams bearing the date 1370. Restoration took place at the end of the 19th/early 20th centuries to prevent complete collapse. A fire in 1963 destroyed the thatched chancel roof, but otherwise caused "little damage".

The significance of the church lies mainly in its late medieval decoration, particularly of the rood screen. Simon Jenkins considers the work "England's finest church screen paintings". The Twelve Apostles are represented in painted panels on the rood screen itself, with a total of 26 saints and bishops shown in panels elsewhere in the church. Pevsner dates them to the 1470s or 1480s and describes their "superb quality".

St Helen's remains a functioning church in the parish of Ranworth with Panxworth.

Architecture and description
The church was begun in the Decorated Gothic style of the 14th century, although Pevsner notes the predominant influence of the Perpendicular style of a century later. It is of Rubble construction with Clipsham stone dressings. A three-storey tower, at the western end of the church, is followed by a nave, with two porches, and a chancel. Beyond the interior paintings, Jenkins considers St Helen's as "of limited architectural interest".

The interior also contains a field altar, used during World War I by the Reverend Teddy Everard, subsequently vicar of Ranworth, as well as a memorial panel commemorating the 14 men of the parish killed in the war.

References

Sources

External links
 Norfolk Churches - An illustrated article on the interior of St Helen's

Church of England church buildings in Norfolk
Ranworth